Calamus Creek is a stream in Douglas County, in the U.S. state of Minnesota.

Calamus Creek was named for the abundance of the calamus plant in the area.

See also
List of rivers of Minnesota

References

Rivers of Douglas County, Minnesota
Rivers of Minnesota